Matthew Schultz (born June 27, 1966, Enid, Oklahoma, United States) is an American musician. He is best known as the creator of the Anti Tank Guitar or A.T.G., used primarily during his work with Lab Report and Pigface, as well as for scoring music for director, Bernard Rose.

History
In 1990, Matthew Schultz and Eric Pounder founded the experimental, dark ambient, improvisational, music project Lab Report and were signed to Invisible Records. Schultz was the creator of the Anti Tank Guitar or A.T.G. Schultz used this instrument on the first four Lab Report albums as well as on the first three Pigface albums. Schultz went on as the head of Lab Report and released four more albums with his own record label, Gein. The music style of these projects broadened and became increasingly more multi-media. Schultz went solo and released seven more albums under his own name. He also composed musical scores for Hollywood horror director, Bernard Rose. The movies include Ivans Xtc and Snuff-Movie.

Later works
In 2010 Schultz became the museum curator, collector and lead historian for The Exhibition for The History of The Division. This esoteric fraternal order is similar to the Freemasons and spans back centuries. Schultz wrote two CDs Mantras and Militant for the exhibition.<ref name=Voices_Art>Foster, Adrienne (2012) The History of The Division”, Voices Pub, Vol 1 pg. 36-37</ref>

Schultz works in shamanic and indigenous practices. He creates sacred geometric artwork and mandalas. Now, he utilizes the A.T.G. to generate chakra healing frequencies and binaural beat mediations. In 2012 he published a book and corresponding CD titled Mandalas and runs events and exhibitions based on the sacred geometry. He was the keynote speaker at the Buckminster Fuller: Exploring the Sacred Geometry of Nature art show.

In 2020, Schultz's book, titled The Dark and the Light - Trauma, Addiction, Shamanism, Ayahuasca, was released. The book is about mystical beliefs such as indigenous and sacred practices.

Discography
Solo workBlue Lady (2000)Subla Kahn Nine One One (2002)Foundspaces (2005)Loops (2007)The Division Mantras (2010)Mandalas (2011)Militant (2012)

Soundtrack workIvans Xtc (2000)Snuff-Moviewith Lab ReportFig X-71 (1991)Unhealthy (1993)Terminal (1995)Excision (1997)All Your Little Pieces, Make Me a Whole (1998)-Classical -Atmospheres (1999)2000 After Death Live (2000)

with PigfaceLean Juicy Pork (1990)Gub (1991)Welcome to Mexico... Asshole (1991)Fook (1992)Truth Will Out (1993)

with Lard70's Rock Must Die'' (2000)

References

External links
 Site about the A.T.G.
 Mantras CD
 Militant CD 
 Mandalas CD 
 Website for Mandala book
 Website for The Division 
 Lab Report band site with discography, interviews, links
 This is a comprehensive information site for Matt Schultz-related projects

1966 births
Living people
American keyboardists
American male guitarists
21st-century American composers
Musicians from Enid, Oklahoma
American film score composers
American world music musicians
American industrial musicians
Dark ambient musicians
21st-century American male musicians
Pigface members